Woodward Building may refer to:

Woodward Building (Birmingham, Alabama), one of the "Heaviest Corner on Earth" buildings, listed on the National Register of Historic Places in Jefferson County, Alabama
Woodward Building (Payette, Idaho), listed on the National Register of Historic Places in Payette County, Idaho

See also
Woodward House (disambiguation)